Irene Molyneux (1923-2019) was an international lawn bowls competitor for England.

Bowls career
In 1981 Molyneux won double gold in the fours with Eileen Fletcher, Mavis Steele, Betty Stubbings and Gloria Thomas and the team event (Taylor Trophy) and a bronze medal in the pairs at the 1981 World Outdoor Bowls Championship in Toronto.

Molyneaux won seven National Championships titles; 1976 (pairs), 1979 (two wood singles), 1974, 1979, 1991, 1996 (triples) and fours (1986). She also won the British Isles Bowls Championships pairs title in 1977 with Margaret Lockwood.

Her husband Jim was President of the Oxford City and County Bowls Club in 1976.

References

1923 births
2019 deaths
English female bowls players
Bowls World Champions